Killer Darts is a 1968 Hong Kong wuxia film produced by the Shaw Brothers Studio and starring Yueh Hua and Chin Ping.

Plot 
Liu Wen-lung's home is attacked by bandits led by Chou Chao. Liu's wife was killed, but his son Yu-long was saved by a faithful servant by hiding in a well. While tracking down the bandit, his disciple Hu Chi-feng attempted to rape a villager. Liu Wen-lung discovers the attempt and Hu escaped, but not before killing his victim with a killer dart stolen from Liu. Liu Wen-lung adopted Yu-sien, the orphaned daughter of the victim, and raised her together with his son, settling down and giving up the pursuit of vengeance.

Yu-long and Yu-sien grew up together and fell in love. However, Yu-sien ran into Hu Chi-feng, who led her to believe from the dart on her mother's body that it was Liu Wen-lung who killed her family.

Cast
Chin Ping as Jin Yu-sien
Yueh Hua as Liu Yu-long
Fang Mian as Liu Wen-lung
Shen Yi as Lin Heung-kam
Pang Pang as Ah-fu
Cheung Pooi-Saan as Hu Chi-feng
Ma Ying as Chou Chao, the Evil One
Tang Ti as Ji Nang
Ngai Ping-ngo as The Flier / Light Footed Hero
Cheung Yuk-kam as Hu's bandit lover
Woo Tung as Master Lin, Kam's father
Siu Lam-wun as Xiao Li, Yu-sien's father
Wong Siu-man as Young Yu-sien
On Wai-lin as Young Yu-long
Ku Feng as Diu Jun, Panda Tiger
Han Ying-chieh as Diu Jung-Long, Green Faced Tiger
Lau Gong as Diu Sok-biu, Flying Tiger
Dean Shek as Tung Kung-Long, Eerie Scholar
Siu Gam as Nang's tall bandit
Man Sau as Master Lin's wife
Lui Hung as Liu Wen-lung's wife
Cheung Hei as Lo San
Hao Li-jen as villager
Nam Wai-lit as bandit
Cham Siu-hung as bandit
Little Unicorn as bandit
Kwan Yan as bandit
Yee Kwan as bandit
Goo Chim-hung as bandit
Simon Chui as bandit
Kei Ho-chiu as Master Lin's servant

External links

1968 films
Hong Kong martial arts films
Wuxia films
Shaw Brothers Studio films
1960s Mandarin-language films
Films directed by Ho Meng Hua